Wilkins or Wilkin is a name variant of William, and may refer to:

People

Given name: Wilkin 

 Wilkins (singer) (Germán Wilkins Vélez Ramírez, born 1953), Puerto Rican pop music singer and composer
 Wilkin Castillo (born 1984), Dominican baseball catcher
 Wilkin Mota (born 1981), Indian cricketer
 Wilkin Ramírez (born 1985), Dominican baseball outfielder
 Wilkin Ruan (born 1978), Dominican baseball outfielder

Given name: Wilkins 

 Wilkins P. Horton (1889–1950), American lawyer, lieutenant governor of North Carolina 1937–1941
 Wilkins Micawber, character in Charles Dickens's novel David Copperfield
 Wilkins F. Tannehill (1787–1858), American politician and author

Surname 
 Wilkins (surname)
 Wilkin (surname)

Places and geographical features
 Edness K. Wilkins State Park, a state park in Wyoming
 Fort Wilkins Historic State Park, a historical location in Michigan
 Wilkins Coast, a portion of the eastern coast of Antarctica
 Wilkin County, Minnesota
 Wilkins (crater), a crater on the Moon
 Wilkins Gulch, a valley in California
 Wilkins Ice Shelf, an ice shelf located in Wilkins Sound
 Wilkins Island, an Island in Antarctica
 Wilkins Peak, a small mountain in Wyoming
 Wilkins Sound, an island sound off the coast of the Antarctic Peninsula
 Wilkins Strait (Canada), a waterway in northern Canada
 Wilkins Township, Allegheny County, Pennsylvania

Structures
 Glover Wilkins Lock, a lock in Mississippi
 Roy Wilkins Auditorium, an arena in Minnesota
 Wilkins Mill Covered Bridge, an American historic bridge
 Wilkins Public School, an Australian school
 Wilkins Runway, an aerodrome in Antarctica

Business
 Bishop Wilkins College, a society in England
 Wilkins Lecture, a series of lectures led by the Royal Society of London
 Wilkin & Sons, an English manufacturer of preserves and associated products
 Wilkins (plumbing), a plumbing parts machining company now owned by Jacuzzi
 Wilkins Radio Network, a 40 station Christian radio service based in South Carolina 
 Wilkins Coffee, a Washington DC-based coffee company, best known for its commercials starring the Muppets.

See also
 Wilken
 Wilkens
 Wilkins House (disambiguation)
 Justice Wilkin (disambiguation)
 Justice Wilkins (disambiguation)